

The Aula Palatina, also called Basilica of Constantine, at Trier, Germany, is a Roman palace basilica and an early Christian structure built between AD 300 and AD 310 during the reigns of Constantius Chlorus and Constantine the Great. 

Today it is used as the Church of the Redeemer and owned by a congregation within the Evangelical Church in the Rhineland. The basilica contains the largest extant hall from antiquity (see List of ancient Greek and Roman roofs. The hall has a length of 67 m, a width of 26.05 m and a height of 33 m. Because of its testimony to the imperial importance of Trier during the Roman Empire and its architecture, the Aula Palatina was designated as a UNESCO World Heritage Site in 1986 as part of the Roman Monuments, Cathedral of St. Peter and Church of Our Lady in Trier site.

Description and History 
Although the Aula Palatina generally follows the standard architectural plan of earlier basilicas, with a lack of columns in the interior and an open, box-like shape, it is unique in its addition of a transverse vestibule reminiscent of a narthex. The basilica was made of solid brick, with black-and-white marble floors, and was equipped with a floor and wall-heating system (hypocaust).  The basilica was originally part of a palace complex and was not a free-standing building, but had other smaller buildings (such as a forehall, a vestibule and some service buildings) attached to it. The outer courtyard and railings on the first and second stories of the basilica no longer exist, but overall it is remarkably well preserved.

During the Middle Ages, it was used as the residence for the Bishop of Trier. For that, the apse was redesigned into living quarters and pinnacles were added to the top of its walls. In the 17th century, the archbishop Lothar von Metternich constructed his palace just next to the Aula Palatina and incorporated it into his palace doing some major redesign. Later, in the 19th century, Frederick William IV of Prussia ordered the building to be restored to its original Roman state, which was done under the supervision of the military architect Carl Schnitzler. In 1856, the Aula Palatina became a Protestant church. In 1944, the building burned due to an air raid of the allied forces during World War II. When it was repaired after the war, the historical inner decorations from the 19th century were not reconstructed, so that the brick walls are visible from the inside as well.

A new organ was installed in 2014. It has over 6,000 organ pipes.

Gallery

Notes

References
 
 William E. Gwatkin Jr.: Roman Trier, in The Classical Journal Vol. 29, No. 1 (October 1933), 3–12 (online reproduction of the original article amended by photographs)
 Helen Gardner, Fred S. Kleiner, Christin J. Mamiya: Gardner's Art Through the Ages. Cengage Learning, 13th edition 2008, p. 205
 Gerardo Brown-Manrique: Konstantinplatz in Trier. Between Memory and Place. In: Places. Forum of design for the public realm. Vol. 3 (1986), No. 1, pages 31–42 (Digitalisat)
 Eberhard Zahn: Die Basilika in Trier. Rheinisches Landesmuseum, Trier 1991,  (German)

Further reading
 Weitzmann, Kurt, ed., Age of spirituality: late antique and early Christian art, third to seventh century, no. 102, 1979, Metropolitan Museum of Art, New York, ; full text available online from The Metropolitan Museum of Art Libraries

External links

  
 History and visiting information
 Panorama View of the Basilica of Constantine
 Site of the Constantine Basilica in Google Maps

310 establishments
4th-century churches
United Protestant church buildings in Germany
Basilica churches in Germany
World Heritage Sites in Germany
Aula Palatina
Aula Palatina
Aula Palatina
Ancient Roman buildings and structures in Germany
Protestant churches in Rhineland-Palatinate
Secular basilicas